Following is a list of all Article III United States federal judges appointed by President Andrew Johnson during his presidency. Johnson appointed only 9 Article III federal judges during his presidency, all to United States district courts. Andrew Johnson is one of only four presidents who did not have an opportunity to appoint a judge to serve on the Supreme Court. In April 1866 he nominated Henry Stanbery to fill the vacancy left with the death of John Catron, but the Republican Congress eliminated the seat with the passage of the Judicial Circuits Act. One of Johnson's district court appointees, Samuel Blatchford, would later be appointed to the Supreme Court by Chester A. Arthur.

Johnson appointed 1 judge to the United States Court of Claims, an Article I tribunal.

District Courts

Specialty courts (Article I)

United States Court of Claims

Notes

References
General

 

Specific

Sources
 Federal Judicial Center

Judicial appointments
Johnson